The Fort de Cindey (Swiss designation A155) is a component of Fortress Saint-Maurice, which is in turn one of the three principal fortified regions of the National Redoubt of Switzerland. The Fort de Cindey was built in two steps: the first, between 1941 and 1946 and the second step, between 1948 and 1954 (the hospital, the artilleries casemates with the gunnery command and the ammunition magazines) . It was taken out of service in 1995. This fort was built in the Scex cliff face immediately to the west of Saint-Maurice to complement the existing Fort du Scex, built earlier in the same cliff. With the Fort du Scex, it comprises a fortress complex encased in rock high above the strategic Saint-Maurice valley. The fort  was deactivated in 1995.  It is now open for public tours during the summer months.

Site
The Fort de Cindey is located in the western cliffs of the Saint-Maurice valley where the defile narrows dramatically. The location was previously fortified in the 19th century. The Château Saint-Maurice remains extant, while extensive fortifications on either side of the Rhône, constructed between 1831 and 1860 by General Guillaume Henri Dufour have disappeared.

Description
Lateral branches to the interior of the mountain lead to troop accommodations, the command post, ammunition magazines and utility areas. The fort was planned as a mixed artillery and infantry position that could provide supporting fire to the anti-tank barrier across the Rhône valley at Lavey.

Cindey is connected to the adjoining Fort du Scex by the natural caves of the Grotte aux Fées. The Fort de Cindey was initially armed with two 105mm guns in individual casemates. Four 90mm anti-tank guns and  three machine guns were added in the 1950s. The fort was also equipped with four mobile 81mm mortars. Ammunition magazines and an infirmary were added at this time. Routine access to the fort for supplies was provided by an aerial cableway. The fort's power and communications were provided by the Fort du Scex, which had  had its guns deactivated and was used as a command post until 1995.

The fort continued in service until 1995, when it was deactivated. All of the guns remain in place.

Present status
The fort is available for public tours in summer months, together with the Fort du Scex and the Grotte aux Fées.

References

External links
 Forts de Scex and Cindey
 Fort de Cindey at Festung-Oberland.ch
 Festung Cindey (in German, access from Schweiz menu)

Fortress Saint-Maurice
Cold War museums in Switzerland
World War II museums in Switzerland
Museums in Valais